Martin Růžička (15 December 1985) is a Czech professional ice hockey player. Růžička is currently playing for HC Oceláři Třinec. Růžička has played professionally for HC Sparta Praha, HC Znojemští Orli, HC Olomouc, HC Oceláři Třinec and Amur Khabarovsk. Růžička participated at the 2010 IIHF World Championship as a member of the Czech Republic men's national ice hockey team.

Playing career
Ruzicka was born in Beroun, and played his youth hockey with HC Berounsti Medvedi. Ruzicka began his junior hockey career with the HC Sparta Praha Under 18 squad in 2000–01. In 2001, he moved to HC Kladno, first for the under-18 squad, then moved up to the under-20 squad, playing two seasons for Kladno. Kladno won the junior title in 2003. Růžička then moved to North America to play major junior hockey for the Everett Silvertips in 2003–04. Růžička scored only 4 goals and 12 assists for Everett and was released after the season to re-enter the 2004 CHL European Import Draft. Růžička played for the Lethbridge Hurricanes in 2004–05, scoring 5 goals and 5 assists in 57 games.

Ruzicka's goal was to play in the NHL but he was not drafted by the National Hockey League (NHL) and he returned to the Czech Republic in 2005. From 2005 until 2011, Ruzicka played for several teams in Czech leagues. He had his best season in the Czech Extraliga league with Trinec in 2010–11, scoring 24 goals and 26 assists for 50 points in 51 games. He broke the Extraliga playoff scoring record, scoring 30 points (15 goals, 15 assists) in 15 games. The previous record of 26 points in 13 games was set by Zigmund Palffy in 1992. The season led to the attention of Amur Khabarovsk of the KHL, which has signed him for the 2011–12 season.

International play
Ruzicka played in the 2005 World Junior Championships for the Czech Republic. He has also played in the 2010 World Championship for the Czech Republic. Ruzicka has also played in various 'friendly' games for the Czech Republic.

Awards
 Eurohockey Player of the Month, March 2011
 Eurohockey Player of the Month, October 2012

Career statistics

Regular season and playoffs

International

References

External links 

1985 births
Amur Khabarovsk players
Czech ice hockey centres
Everett Silvertips players
Lethbridge Hurricanes players
Living people
HC Oceláři Třinec players
HC Olomouc players
Orli Znojmo players
People from Beroun
HC Sparta Praha players
Traktor Chelyabinsk players
Ice hockey players at the 2018 Winter Olympics
Olympic ice hockey players of the Czech Republic
Sportspeople from the Central Bohemian Region
Czech expatriate ice hockey players in Canada
Czech expatriate ice hockey players in the United States
Czech expatriate ice hockey players in Russia